Parliamentary elections were held in Norway on 20 October 1930. The Labour Party won the most seats (47 of the 150 seats) in the Storting.

During the election, the Labour Party advocated for socialist policies whereas the Conservative, Liberal and Agrarian parties ran in opposition to the Labour Party.

Results

Seat distribution

Notes

References

General elections in Norway
1930s elections in Norway
Norway
Parliamentary
Norway